Daniel Alexander Slania (born May 24, 1992) is an American former Major League Baseball pitcher who played for the San Francisco Giants in 2017.

Amateur career
Slania was drafted by the Boston Red Sox in the 42nd round of the 2010 Major League Baseball Draft out of Salpointe High School in Tucson, Arizona. He did not sign with the Red Sox and attended the University of Notre Dame to play college baseball. In 2012, he played collegiate summer baseball with the Cotuit Kettleers of the Cape Cod Baseball League, and was named a league all-star.

Professional career
Slania was drafted by the San Francisco Giants in the fifth round of the 2013 Major League Baseball Draft. He became a starting pitcher midway through the 2016 season after previously pitching in relief throughout his career and in college. The Giants added him to their 40-man roster after the season.

Slania made his Major League debut on June 30, 2017, and was outrighted to AAA on November 20, 2017. He was released on March 18, 2019.

References

External links

 Notre Dame Fighting Irish bio

1992 births
Living people
Baseball players from Phoenix, Arizona
Major League Baseball pitchers
San Francisco Giants players
Notre Dame Fighting Irish baseball players
Cotuit Kettleers players
Salem-Keizer Volcanoes players
Augusta GreenJackets players
Richmond Flying Squirrels players
San Jose Giants players
Scottsdale Scorpions players
Sacramento River Cats players